Barawertornis tedfordi was a dromornithid (mihirung), a large flightless fowl hailing from Late Oligocene to Early Miocene. The only species in the genus Barawertornis, its fossil remains are found in strata of the Riversleigh deposits located at two sites in Northwestern Queensland, Australia. 

It was described in 1979 by Patricia Vickers-Rich from fragmentary but diagnostic remains, three pieces of the hind limbs and a vertebra. More fragments specimens were described in 2004 and new material that emerged from Riversleigh was analysed and compared with other dromornithids to test previously published theories on relationships within the family.

B. tedfordi is currently the smallest known species of dromornithid, comparable in size to the cassowaries and weighing in at 80 to 95 kilograms.

This mihirung was a fleet-footed species, probably a herbivore, that dwelt in the forest habitat covering most of Australia at the time of the bird's existence. These birds were similar in the form and habitat of the modern Casuarius casuarius, the flightless and rainforest dwelling the southern cassowary.

The name of the genus, Barawertornis, derives from an Aboriginal language, a word for ground Barawerti, and the Ancient Greek ornis, bird. The specific epithet refers to Richard H. Tedford for that researcher's discoveries of tertiary avian fauna in Australia.

See also
 Australian megafauna
 History of Australia

Footnotes

References
  (2001): Australian Museum Fact Sheets: 'Thunder Birds' - The Family Dromornithidae. Retrieved 2006-OCT-17.
  (2005): A New Flightless Gallinule (Aves: Rallidae: Gallinula) from the Oligo-Miocene of Riversleigh, Northwestern Queensland, Australia. (2005) Records of the Australian Museum 57(2): 179–190. ODF fulltext
  (1999): Information Letter 13. HTML fulltext

Dromornithidae
Oligocene birds
Miocene birds
Extinct flightless birds
Miocene birds of Australia
Bird genera
Riversleigh fauna
Neogene birds of Australia
Fossil taxa described in 1979